The AN/USQ-17 or Naval Tactical Data System (NTDS) computer referred to in Sperry Rand documents as the Univac M-460, was Seymour Cray's last design for UNIVAC. UNIVAC later released a commercial version, the UNIVAC 490. That system was later upgraded to a multiprocessor configuration as the 494.

Overview
The machine was the size and shape of a refrigerator, about four feet high (roughly 1.20 meters), with a hinged lid for access. Shortly after completing the prototype design, Cray left to join Control Data Corporation. When the Navy awarded Sperry Rand a US$50 million contract to build the AN/USQ-17, Univac engineers redesigned the entire machine from scratch using silicon transistors. They retained the instruction set, so that programs developed for the original machine would still run on the new one.

As part of the redesign it was decided to improve access, and the second version was designed to stand upright, like an old fashioned double-door refrigerator, about six feet tall (roughly 1.80 m). This new design was designated the AN/USQ-20.

Instructions were represented as 30-bit words, in the following format:
   f   6 bits   function code 
   j   3 bits   jump condition designator 
   k   3 bits   partial word designator 
   b   3 bits   which index register to use 
   y  15 bits   operand address in memory

Numbers were represented as 30-bit words, this allowed for five 6-bit alphanumeric characters per word.

The main memory was 32,768 = 32K words of core memory.

The available processor registers were:
One 30-bit accumulator (A).
One 30-bit Q register (combined with A to give a total of 60 bits for the result of multiplication or the dividend in division).
Seven 15-bit index registers (B1–B7).

The instruction format defined for the AN/USQ-17 marked the beginning of an instruction set which would be carried on, with many changes along the way, into later UNIVAC computers including the UNIVAC 1100/2200 series, which is still in use .

First delivery of NTDS and related U.S. Navy computers
 AN/USQ17, 30 bit, March 1958
CP-642 AKA AN/USQ-20, 30 bit, 1960
AN/UYK-8,   30 bit, 1967
AN/UYK-7,   32 bit, 1971
AN/UYK-43,  32 bit, 1984
AN/UYK-20,  16 bit, 1973
AN/AYK-14,  16 bit, 1980
AN/UYK-44,  16 bit, 1984

See also
List of UNIVAC products
History of computing hardware

References

External links
“M-460 Computer Characteristics” – PDF ... 32pp (1956)
The Univac M-460 Computer – Paper by J. E. Thornton, M. Macaulay, and D. H. Toth, Remington Rand Univac Division of Sperry Rand (on-line version from Ed Thelen's Antique Computer Home Page)

UNIVAC hardware
Transistorized computers
Military computers
Military electronics of the United States